Ensanche Simón Bolívar is a Sector in the city of Santo Domingo in the National District of the Dominican Republic. This neighborhood is populated in particular by individuals of the lower and middle class. It is a neighborhood half danger to be the middle of two much more dangerous neighborhood that are the cañita and the capotillo since they know that the capotillo is one of the neighborhood with more delinquency of the national district

Sources 
https://adn.gob.do/ 

Geography of Santo Domingo